Júlio Tavares Rebimbas (21 June 1922 – 6 December 2010) was the Roman Catholic archbishop (personal title) of the Roman Catholic Diocese of Porto, Portugal.

Ordained to the priesthood in 1945, Tavares Rebimbas was named bishop in 1965 and became bishop of the Porto Diocese in 1982 and retired in 1997.

Notes

1922 births
2010 deaths
Bishops of Porto